Octavian Cotescu (14 February 1931 – 22 August 1985) was a Romanian actor.

Activity

Filmography
 Diminețile unui băiat cuminte (1967)
 Atunci i-am condamnat pe toți la moarte (1972) 
 Păcală (1974) – the tax collector
 Toamna bobocilor (1975) – commentator
 Operațiunea Monstrul (1976) – Eugen
 Iarna bobocilor (1977) – commentator
 Iarba verde de acasă (1977) – the inspector
 Blestemul pământului, blestemul iubirii (1978) – the teacher Herdelea 
 Eu, tu, și... Ovidiu (1978) 
 Castelul din Carpați (1981) – impresarul
 O scrisoare pierdută – Nae Cațavencu
 Calculatorul mărturisește (1982)
 Buletin de București (1983) – Costică Popescu
 Secretul lui Bachus (1984)
 Căsătorie cu repetiție (1985) – Costică Popescu
 O clipă de răgaz (1986)
 Promisiuni (1985)
 Sosesc păsările călătoare (1984)
 Escapada (1983)
  (1983) TV series
 O lebădă iarna (1983)
 Miezul fierbinte al pâinii (1983)
 Singur de cart (1983)
 Un accident numit Duffy (1983)
 Aventură sub pământ (1982) (TV)
 Rămân cu tine (1982)
 Un saltimbanc la Polul Nord (1982) – Cezar Marcelloni
 Înghițitorul de săbii (1981)
 Saltimbancii (1981) – Cezar Marcelloni
 Șantaj (1981)
 Bietul Ioanide (1979)
 Ion: Blestemul pământului, blestemul iubirii (1979) – Zaharia Herdelea
 Vacanță tragică (1979)
 Din nou împreună (1978)
 Aurel Vlaicu (1977)
 Împușcături sub clar de lună (1977) – Beldea
 Bunicul și doi delincvenți minori (1976) – the grandfather
 Gloria nu cântă (1976)
 Instanța amână pronunțarea (1976)
 Un orfelin iubea o orfelină (1976) (TV)
 Serenadă pentru etajul XII (1976)
 Cercul magic (1975)
 Capcana (1974)
 Muntele ascuns (1974)
 Tăticul (1974) (TV)
 Proprietarii (1973)
 Bariera (1972)
 Drum în penumbră (1972)
 De ochii lumii (1971) (TV)
 Puterea și adevărul (1971)
 Asediul (1970)
 Castelul condamnaților (1969) –  Costăchel
 Balul de sâmbătă seara (1968) –  Toma
 Cartierul veseliei (1964)
 O dragoste lungă de-o seară (1963)
 Iubirea e un lucru foarte mare (1962) – TV miniseries

Theatre

References

External links

Octavian Cotescu, Revista Teatrală Radio, Radio România Cultural
 Octavian Cotescu, Ziarul Metropolis
 

Romanian male film actors
1931 births
1985 deaths
People from Dorohoi
Romanian male stage actors